The 2019 Asian Shooting Championships were the 14th Asian Shooting Championships and took place from 5 to 13 November 2019, at Lusail Shooting Complex, Doha, Qatar.

It acted as the Asian qualifying tournament for the 2020 Summer Olympics in Tokyo.

Medal summary

Men

Women

Mixed

Medal table

References

External links
ISSF
ISSF Results

Asian Shooting Championships
Asian
Asian Shooting Championships
Asian Shooting Championships